Union Township is an inactive township in Polk County, in the U.S. state of Missouri.

Union Township was formed by merger (or "union") of two other townships, hence the name.

References

Townships in Missouri
Townships in Polk County, Missouri